Dravidian, Dravidan, or Dravida may refer to:

Language and culture
Dravidian languages, a family of languages spoken mainly in South India and northeastern Sri Lanka
Proto-Dravidian language, a model of the common ancestor of the Dravidian languages
Dravidian University, a university situated in Andhra Pradesh
South Indian culture, modern Dravidian culture

Geography
Dravida Nadu, a proposed country for the southern Dravidian languages
South India, the region which is called Dravida in the Indian anthem
Dravida Kingdom, an ancient region mentioned in the Mahabharata

Ethnicity
Dravidian peoples, ethnic groups primarily in South India.
Homo Dravida, a historically defined race, propagated also by Devaneya Pavanar
Adi Dravida, natives of Southern India

Religion
Dravidian folk religion

Others
Dravidan (1989 film), a 1989 Tamil film
Dravida Sangha

See also
 Dravid (surname)
 Davidian (disambiguation)

Language and nationality disambiguation pages